The Spoilers is a novel written by English author Desmond Bagley, and was first published in 1969 with a cover by Norman Weaver.

Plot introduction
When wealthy film tycoon, Sir Robert Hellier, loses his daughter to a heroin overdose, he declares war on the drug peddlers. He offers London drug treatment specialist, Nicholas Warren MD, unlimited financing to use his insider knowledge of the drug trade to smash the major international drug ring responsible. Initially reluctant, Warren is convinced by professional interest and personal circumstances to organise a team of friends and specialists who will use a combination of deceit and violence to infiltrate and bring down the drug ring, and to destroy a hundred million dollars' worth of heroin at its source in the Middle East.

External links
Crime Time review of Desmond Bagley
Fantastic Fiction site with publication history

1969 British novels
Novels by Desmond Bagley
Novels set in the Middle East
William Collins, Sons books